The First Word in Memory is a studio album by American country artist Janie Fricke. It was released in August 1984 via Columbia Records and was a collection of ten tracks. The disc was the ninth studio project of Fricke's career and her third highest-charting album on the American country LP's chart. Spawned from the album were two singles: "Your Heart's Not in It" and the title track. Both songs would become major country hits in the United States and Canada.

Background and content
When Janie Fricke began focusing on ballads in the early 1980s, her singles led to a breakthrough in country music. She began a string of top ten and number one country songs like "Down to My Last Broken Heart", "Tell Me a Lie" and "It Ain't Easy Bein' Easy". She would further adapt by implementing up-tempo country pop into her music with the releases It Ain't Easy (1982) and Love Lies (1983). For The First Word in Memory, Fricke would continue this same trend. Her 1984 project was recorded at The Bennett House and was produced by Bob Montgomery. It was Fricke's third album with Montgomery. The First Word in Memory contained a total of ten tracks. It included a song written by Dave Loggins called "Without Each Other". The track was a duet with singer Benny Wilon. The project also contained a song composed by Pam Tillis called "One Way Ticket", along with "In Between Heartaches" was composed by Deborah Allen.

Release, reception and singles

The First Word in Memory was originally released in August 1984 on Columbia Records. It was the ninth studio collection released in her music career. The album was originally offered as both a vinyl LP and a cassette. In later years, the album was re-released to digital markets which included Apple Music.  In its original release, The First Word in Memory made America's Billboard country albums survey. In total, the disc spent 32 weeks on the chart before reaching the number 17 position. It was Fricke's third highest-charting album on Billboard in her career. The album would later receive a three-star rating from AllMusic.

Two singles were spawned from The First Word in Memory. Its first single issued was "Your Heart's Not in It", which was distributed by Columbia Records in August 1984. The single spent 23 weeks on the Billboard Hot Country Songs chart and spent one week at the number one spot in December 1984. The album's title track was released by Columbia in December 1984 as the final single. The song reached the top ten of the Billboard country list in 1985, peaking at the number seven spot in the spring. In Canada, "Your Heart's Not in It" reached number one the RPM country songs chart and the title track climbed to number five.

Track listings

Original versions

Digital version

Personnel
All credits are adapted from the liner notes of The First Word in Memory.

Musical personnel
 Janie Fricke – lead and backing vocals
Larry Byrom - acoustic and electric guitar
 Kenny Mims – electric guitar
 The Nashville String Machine – strings
 Ron Oates – keyboards
 Judy Rodman – backing vocals
 Michael Spriggs – mandolin
 James Stroud – drums
 William C. Warren – backing vocals
 Tony Wiggins – backing vocals
 Benny Wilson – backing vocals
 Bob Wray – bass

Technical personnel
 Don Cobb – second engineer
 Gene Eichelberger – first engineer
 Carl Gorodetzky – concertmaster
 Dan Ham – photography
 Bill Johnson – art direction
 Bob Montgomery – producer
 Ron Oates – arrangement 
 Danny Purcell – mastering 
 Dan Sellers – photography

Charts

Release history

References

1984 albums
Albums produced by Bob Montgomery (songwriter)
Columbia Records albums
Janie Fricke albums